The Yajisha Bridge is an arch bridge located in Guangzhou, Guangdong, China. Opened in 2000, it has a main span of  making it one of the longest arch bridge spans in the world.

Gallery

See also 
List of longest arch bridge spans

References

External links

 

Arch bridges in China
Bridges in Guangzhou
Bridges over the Pearl River (China)
Bridges completed in 2000